Arene stellata is a species of sea snail, a marine gastropod in the family Areneidae.  It is an invertebrate, and is a species of  mollusk. It lives underwater in major oceans.

References

External links
 To ITIS
 To World Register of Marine Species

Areneidae
Gastropods described in 1970